Rugby league in Western Australia is played at amateur level, but attracts an audience particularly for the State of Origin series. 

The state was represented at national level by the Western Reds/Perth Reds, but they were not included in the new National Rugby League in 1998 following the Super League war. The West Coast Pirates are aiming for eventual inclusion in the National Rugby League.

History

The Western Australia Rugby League was formed in 1948 with Fremantle, Perth, South Perth and Cottesloe as the foundation clubs. In 1950 the Australian Rugby League Board of Control sent ex Kangaroos hooker Arthur Folwell to Western Australia to try to promote the game.

Although touring Great Britain and French rugby league teams had played tour matches in Perth, it was not until the late 1980s that the New South Wales Rugby League played games there.

New South Wales Rugby League matches
In August 1989, the NSWRL played the first game outside New South Wales or Queensland, with a crowd of 21,992 watching Canberra play Canterbury at the WACA.

Subsequent fixtures between 1990 and 1993 were equally well supported, and the League realised that a Perth team could be successful. Perth's application for the Winfield Cup was accepted on 30 November 1992, along with the South Queensland Crushers, the North Queensland Cowboys and the Auckland Warriors. The early tip for the nickname of the Perth side was Pumas, but the red kangaroo, Western Australia's best-known native animal, was chosen and the team became known as the Western Reds, with the colours of Red, Black, Yellow and White.

Western Reds and Super League War
Western Australia's first rugby league team to play in a national competition were the Western Reds, who played in the 1995 and 1996 seasons of the Australian Rugby League. In 1997 they changed their name to the Perth Reds and joined the Super League as inaugural members.

Despite showing some promise (particularly in the underage competitions) the Reds were not invited to join the National Rugby League in 1998 as part of the agreement to end the Super League war.

In 2007 the Western Australia Rugby League re-formed the team as the WA Reds to compete in the Jim Beam Cup from 2008, with a view to entering the National Rugby League competition in 2012. Their home ground is Perth Oval.

NRL and State of Origin series in Perth
On 14 February 2009 Perth Oval played host to the first NRL pre-season match for the year between St George-Illawarra Dragons and Sydney Roosters. The match was a one sided affair but a great stepping stone for WA Rugby League with just under 10,000 supporters in attendance.

On Saturday 13 June 2009 at Members Equity Stadium, Perth the South Sydney Rabbitohs and Melbourne Storm played in front of a crowd of 15,197. The Melbourne Storm ran out winners 28–22 in a very successful night for organisers of the Rabbitohs who took their home game to Perth, the NRL and the WARL (Western Australia Rugby League), who now have even more reasons to seriously consider a bid to have the WA Reds back into the Elite Rugby League Competition (NRL). The Rabbitohs again hosted one of their home games in Perth 2010, on the back of the success of the 2009 encounter, again against the Storm. In 2011, the Rabbitohs' played the Brisbane Broncos on a Friday night, a rarity in such a foreign territory for the NRL.

The National Rugby League played a double-header at Perth Stadium in round 1 of the 2018 NRL season in front of 38,842 fans.

In recent years State of Origin series matches between Queensland and New South Wales have been showcased in Perth in an effort to grow the code's audience, attracting fans from across the country. The second match of the 2019 State of Origin series between New South Wales and Queensland was played at Perth Stadium on 23 June 2019 and marked the first Origin game to be played in Western Australia. New South Wales defeated Queensland 38–6 in front of a record crowd for the code in the state of 59,721 spectators. The second match of the 2022 State of Origin series was also played in Perth, attracting an attendance of 59,358.

Governing body

The Western Australia Rugby League (WARL) is responsible for administering the game of rugby league in Western Australia. Western Australia is an Affiliated State of the overall Australian governing body the Australian Rugby League.

Competitions

Smarter Than Smoking Premiership

Goldfields Rugby League

Pilbara Rugby League

State Representative Team

The WARL also forms a state team to compete in the Affiliated States Championship each year. Western Australia is considered to have the strongest state team of the three non-rugby league states in mainland Australia and have won most of the Affiliated States Championships.

See also

 Sport in Western Australia
 Rugby league in Australia

References

External links
 Official website of Western Australia Rugby League
 Rugby League clubs in Western Australia

 
Western